Mitogen-activated protein kinase 15, also known as MAPK15, ERK7, or ERK8, is an enzyme that in humans is encoded by the MAPK15 gene.

Evolutionarily, MAPK15 is conserved in a number of species, including P. troglodytes, B. taurus, M. musculus, R. norvegicus, D. rerio, D. melanogaster, C. elegans, and X. laevis.

Function 

The protein encoded by this gene is a member of the MAP (mitogen-activated protein) kinase family. MAP kinases are also known as extracellular signal-regulated kinases (ERKs), and are involved in signaling cascades that regulate a number of cellular processes, including proliferation, differentiation, and transcriptional regulation. MAPK15 is often referred to as ERK7 or ERK8, and the latter two share 69% amino acid sequence similarity; at least one study has suggested that the two are, in fact, distinct proteins.

In vertebrate models, ERK8 is not constitutively active, and exhibits relatively low basal kinase activity. It contains two SH3 (SRC homology 3) binding motifs in its C-terminal region, and is likely activated by an SRC-dependent signaling pathway. SRC is a non-receptor tyrosine kinase (and proto-oncogene) that has been implicated in cancer growth and progression in humans when it is overexpressed. The exact function of MAPK15 is unknown, though a number of studies have implicated the enzyme in various cellular pathways.

Specifically, MAPK15 expression is significantly reduced in human lung and breast carcinomas, and MAPK15 down-regulation is correlated with increased cell motility. MAPK15 has also been found to negatively regulate protein O-glycosylation with acetyl galactosamine (GalNAc), a process in which a sugar molecule is covalently attached to an oxygen atom on an amino acid residue. Mammalian MAPK15 is a putative regulator of the cellular localization and transcriptional activity of estrogen-related receptor alpha (ERRa), as well as an inhibitor of proliferating cell nuclear antigen (PCNA) degradation. PCNA is critical for DNA replication, and is an essential factor in protecting genome stability. MAPK15 has also been shown to regulate ciliogenesis in X. laevis (African clawed frog) embryos by phosphorylating an actin regulator called CapZIP.

Interactions 

MAPK15 has been demonstrated to interact with gamma-aminobutyric acid receptor-associated protein (GABARAP) and microtubule-associated proteins 1A/1B light chain 3A (MAP1LC3A, or LC3) in a process that stimulates autophagy.  A number of additional proteins also interact with MAPK15, including cyclin-dependent kinase 2 (CDK2), mitogen-activated protein kinase 12 (MAPK12), and lactotransferrin (LTF), among many others.

Clinical significance 

Due to its role in protecting genomic integrity and cell motility, MAPK15 has been identified as a potential target for cancer therapeutics. Additionally, given the putative role that MAPK15 plays in the regulation of ciliogenesis, it may be an ideal target for diseases related to human ciliary defects (often called ciliopathies).

References

Further reading

External links 
 MAP Kinase Resource 

EC 2.7.11